Inka Murata is an archaeological site in the Altiplano of Bolivia. It is located in the Oruro Department, Litoral Province, Escara Municipality, in the community of Escara. The site with the adjacent burial towers (chullpa) was declared a National Historical Monument by Law 3833 on January 23, 2008.

References 

Archaeological sites in Bolivia
Oruro Department
Tombs in Bolivia